The United Nations Commission on Conventional Armaments was founded as a result of the founding United Nations treaty in 1946. The goal of the commission was to find ways to reduce the size of non-nuclear armaments around the world. The Commission was formally established by the Security Council Resolution on 13 February 1947. The five permanent members of the United Nation Security Council could not agree on how to achieve this aim and so the first report of the Commission in 1949 made no substantial recommendations.

In 1950, the Soviet Union refused to sit with the representatives of the "Kuomintang group" (i.e. the non-communist Chinese representatives) on the Commission. This brought an effective end to the Commission's discussion. It was formally dissolved in 1952.

References

Links 
Resolution 300 of the Fourth Session of the United Nations
United Nations archive records on the Commission
Report from the Disarmament Times

See also
Convention on Certain Conventional Weapons
United Nations Security Council Resolution 77
United Nations Disarmament Commission

Organizations established by the United Nations